Sulphur Springs is an unincorporated community in northern Yell County, Arkansas, United States. The peak of Spring Mountain in southeast Logan County is about 1.5 miles to the north. 

The Sulphur Springs Cemetery is listed on the National Register of Historic Places.

References

Unincorporated communities in Yell County, Arkansas
Unincorporated communities in Arkansas